Kryukovskaya is a rural locality (a village) in Kumzerskoye Rural Settlement, Kharovsky District, Vologda Oblast, Russia. The population was 2 as of 2002.

Geography 
Kryukovskaya is located 50 km northwest of Kharovsk (the district's administrative centre) by road. Terenikha is the nearest rural locality.

References 

Rural localities in Kharovsky District